The 1965 World Figure Skating Championships were held in Colorado Springs, Colorado, USA from March 2 to 7. At the event, sanctioned by the International Skating Union, medals were awarded in men's singles, ladies' singles, pair skating, and ice dance.

Results

Men

Judges:
 Edwin Kucharz 
 William E. Lewis 
 Zdeněk Fikar 
 N. Valdes 
 Eugen Romminger 
 Ferenc Kertész 
 Sonia Bianchetti 
 Yvonne S. McGowan 
 Sergei Vasiliev

Ladies

Judges:
 Martin Felsenreich 
 Ralph S. McCreath 
 Emil Skákala 
 Jeanine Donnier-Blanc 
 Carla Listing 
 Pamela Davis 
 Haruo Konno 
 Jane Sullivan 
 Tatiana Tolmacheva

Pairs

Judges:
 Walter Malek 
 Ralph S. McCreath 
 Erika Schiechtl 
 Carla Listing 
 Ercole Cattaneo 
 Pamela Davis 
 René Schlageter 
 H. Janes 
 Tatiana Tolmacheva

Ice dance

Judges:
 Walter Malek 
 Dorothy Leamen 
 Emil Skákala 
 Lysiane Lauret 
 Ferenc Kertész 
 Robert S. Hudson 
 M. Ridgely

Sources
 Result list provided by the ISU

World Figure Skating Championships
World Figure Skating Championships
Sports competitions in Colorado Springs, Colorado
International figure skating competitions hosted by the United States
World Figure Skating Championships
World Figure Skating Championships
World Figure Skating Championships
1960s in Colorado Springs, Colorado